The men's doubles competition of the table tennis event at the 2007 Southeast Asian Games was held from 8 to 9 December at the Klang Plaza in Nakhon Ratchasima, Thailand.

Participating nations
A total of 38 athletes from ten nations competed in men's doubles table tennis at the 2007 Southeast Asian Games:

Schedule
All times are Thailand Time (UTC+07:00).

Results

Round of 32
8 December 10:00

Final 16

References

External links
 

Table tennis